Sekolah Menengah Kebangsaan Ibrahim (English: Ibrahim Secondary School; abbreviated SMKI) is a morning session National Secondary School (SMK) in Sungai Petani, Kedah, Malaysia. It is a co-education school which offers education level from Form 1 to Form 5 and as well as Form 6. It also provides dormitory for students who wish to reside at the school's dormitory. Students of the school are commonly referred as Ibrahimians.

History
Sekolah Menengah Kebangsaan Ibrahim was established in August 1919 by Mr. E.A.G. Stuart, who was the Superintendent of Education of Kedah and Perlis, of colonial British-Malaya. The school was named Government English School. The school consisted of a longhouse with cemented floor and wooden walls, consisting of three classrooms.

Before the school was opened, Mr. Stuart invited teachers from the Government English School (now known as Sultan Abdul Hamid College), Alor Setar to hold the position of principal of the newly formed school. Allahyarham Tuan Syed Jan was selected to be the first headmaster.

Most of the initial students came from an Anglo Chinese school which closed down. Student qualification of the school was different from other schools. The lowest standard was known as Class Primary. Students studied two years in Class Primary which was known as Primary 1 and Primary 2 before advancing to Standard 1. Students who were bright were allowed to advance to Standard 1 after only one year in Class Primary.

In 1921 and 1922, three more teachers were sent to the school in view of the increasing number of students. The government rented a shop house in Jalan Petri to cater for this purpose..

In 1935, the school was relocated to Jalan Kolam Air, where the school currently stands and was renamed as Sultan Hamid School. The school was further renamed in 1936, in honour of Almarhum Yang Teramat Mulia Tengku Ibrahim Ibni Sultan Abdul Hamid Halim Shah, the Regent of Kedah (1913–1914).

Principals
 Tuan Syed Jan Al-Jefree (1919–1946)
 Y. Bhg Dato' J.F. Augustin (1946–1953)
 Encik Lim Chien Chye (1953–1958)
 Encik Kok Swee Hong (1958–1962)
 Y.Bhg Dato' Syed Abu Bakar Barakbah (1963)
 Encik K.K Koshy (1963–1966)
 Y. Bhg Dato' G. Raja Gopal, FRGS (1967–1971)
 Encik K.K Koshy (1972–1973)
 Encik P.A Norton (1973–1975)
 Tuan Haji Yahaya B. Haji Awang, BCK (1976–1982)
 Tuan Haji Syed Ahmad b. Syed Yasin, PJK (1982–1987)
 Tuan Haji Mohamad Amin b. Abdul Rahman, PJK (1987–1993)
 Tuan Haji Atan Awang b. Abdullah (1994–1995)
 Tuan Haji Md Jaffar b. Haji Din, BCK, BKM (1995–1999)
 Tuan Haji Rosli b. Pin (1999–2004)
 Puan Hajah Haminah bt. Haji Rejab (2004–2005)
 Tuan Haji Mansor b. Lebai Habib, BCK (2005–2006)
 Encik Menteri b. Abdullah (2006)
 Encik Ramli
 Encik Nasrudin b. Abd. Rahman 
Encik Ideris bin Abd. Rahim

Sport houses
Students are grouped into five houses:
 Sultan - kuning - No. 5 and 0
 Sultanah - merah - No. 3 and 8
 Bendahara - ungu- No. 2 and 7
 Raja Muda- biru - No.1 and 6
 Syed Jan - hijau - No. 4 and 9

The Annual Sports Day were introduced in 1946 by the second principal, Dato' J.F. Augustin. The last number in students school number determine the sport houses. For example, if a student's school number is 13187, then that student's sport house is Bendahara.

Academic achievement
Students have continued their studies at seats of higher learning, both in Malaysia e.g. University of Malaya, National University of Malaysia, Universiti Sains Malaysia, Universiti Pertanian Malaysia, Universiti Teknologi Malaysia; and around the world including top universities such as University of Cambridge, United Kingdom and Massachusetts Institute of Technology, USA.

In 2007, the school achieved a 100% pass rate for the Lower Secondary Examinations (Penilaian Menengah Rendah - PMR). With 113 students scoring straight A, SMK Ibrahim emerged as the second best school in Kedah and was ranked as the 10th best school in Malaysia.

The school has produced students with excellent results in the Malaysian Certificate of Education (Sijil Pelajaran Malaysia - SPM; equivalent to the British O Level), and the Malaysian Higher Certificate of Education (Sijil Tinggi Persekolahan Malaysia - STPM; equivalent to the British A Levels). In the 2007 SPM examinations, 24 students obtained 11As. One of the students, Neoh Beng Ying, scored 13 1As and was nominated as one of the top scorers in the state for this examination.

SMK Ibrahim has been awarded '5-Stars' by the Malaysian Ministry of Education in recognition of its achievement as a center of educational excellence.

The school receives royal patronage from the royal family of the state of Kedah, with the Sultan normally attending the Annual Speech and Award Presentation Day to award honours to the top academic and co-curricular achievers.

Curricular achievement
SMK Ibrahim has cricket, hockey, tennis, chess, football, basketball and rugby teams.

1919 establishments in British Malaya
Kuala Muda District
Schools in Kedah
Secondary schools in Malaysia